Asher Peak is a peak  high in the southwest portion of Mount Flint in the McCuddin Mountains of Marie Byrd Land.

It was mapped by the United States Geological Survey from surveys and from U.S. Navy air photos, 1959–65, and named by the Advisory Committee on Antarctic Names for Bill F. Asher, U.S. Navy, Senior Chief Construction Electrician at Little America V in 1958. He was Nuclear Power Plant Operator and Instrument Maintenance Supervisor with the nuclear power unit at McMurdo Station in 1969.

References
 

Mountains of Marie Byrd Land